Mkrtich Avetisi Avetisian (Terlemezian, 1864 in Van – 1896 in Van) was an Armenian journalist and political figure, one of the founders of Armenakan organization.

He studied in Van, then became a student of Mekertich Portukalian. In this period he participated to "Black Cross" liberational organization, founded the Armenian Patriotic Union, then headed Armenakan organization in Van. In 1886, he was deported by the Turkish authorities, lived in Tripoli and Marseille, contributed to "Armenia" newspaper. In 1893-1896 he was the common revisor of Armenian schools in Persia, in 1896 during the Hamidian massacres he headed the Van resistance and was killed by Turkish soldiers.

Sources
Concise Armenian Encyclopedia, ed. by acad. K. Khudaverdian, Vol. 1, Yerevan, 1990, pp. 310–311.

1864 births
1896 deaths
Armenian nationalists
People from Van, Turkey
Armenians from the Ottoman Empire
Armenian journalists
Armenian Democratic Liberal Party politicians
19th-century journalists
Male journalists
Armenian male writers
19th-century male writers